Joseph Halstead Anderson (August 25, 1800 – June 23, 1870) was a farmer and an American politician who served as a U.S. Representative from New York.

Biography
He was born on August 25, 1800, in Harrison, Westchester County, New York. He attended the common schools, and engaged in agricultural pursuits.

Anderson served as member of the New York State Assembly in 1833 and 1834; and as Sheriff of Westchester County from 1835 to 1838.

Elected as a Democrat to the Twenty-eighth and Twenty-ninth Congresses, Anderson served from March 4, 1843 to March 3, 1847. While in Congress, he served as chairman of the Committee on Agriculture during the Twenty-ninth Congress. He was not a candidate for renomination in 1846 and resumed his farming pursuits.

Anderson died on June 23, 1870, in White Plains, New York; and was interred at a family graveyard, "Anderson Hill", Westchester County, New York.

New York State Senator Henry A. Wise (1906–1982) was his great-grandson.

References

External links
 
 

1800 births
1870 deaths
People from Harrison, New York
Democratic Party members of the New York State Assembly
Democratic Party members of the United States House of Representatives from New York (state)
19th-century American politicians
New York (state) sheriffs